Diarrhetic shellfish poisoning (DSP) is one of the four recognized symptom types of shellfish poisoning, the others being paralytic shellfish poisoning, neurotoxic shellfish poisoning and amnesic shellfish poisoning.

As the name suggests, this syndrome manifests itself as intense diarrhea and severe abdominal pains. Nausea and vomiting may sometimes occur too.

DSP and its symptoms usually set in within about half an hour of ingesting infected shellfish, and last for about one day. A recent case in France, though, with 20 people consuming oysters manifested itself after 36 hours. The causative poison is okadaic acid, which inhibits intestinal cellular de-phosphorylation. This causes the cells to become very permeable to water and causes profuse, intense diarrhea with a high risk of dehydration. As no life-threatening symptoms generally emerge from this, no fatalities from DSP have ever been recorded.

See also
 Amnesic shellfish poisoning (ASP)
 Neurotoxic shellfish poisoning (NSP)
 Paralytic shellfish poisoning (PSP)
 Harmful algal blooms (HABs)

References

External links
 Diarrhetic Shellfish Poisoning 

Diarrhea
Seafood
Toxic effect of noxious substances eaten as food